The NorZone Premier League is a semi-professional soccer league in Darwin, Australia. 
The NorZone Premier League is one of three top tier state-level soccer competition in the Northern Territory of Australia. It comprises teams within the NorZone region, centred in Darwin and the surrounding rural areas. The league is conducted by the state administrative body, Football Northern Territory.

Clubs
The following clubs are participating in the 2020 NorZone Premier League.

 Casuarina FC
 Darwin Hearts FC
 Hellenic Athletic
 Mindil Aces FC
 Port Darwin FC
 University Azzurri FC

References

External links
Football Federation Northern Territory Official website

 
Sports leagues established in 2006
2006 establishments in Australia